Trèves may refer to:

 The French name of the city of Trier, in Germany
 François Trèves (born 1930), a French-American mathematician

France
Trèves is the name or part of the name of several communes in France:

 Trèves, Gard, in the Gard department
 Trèves, Rhône, in the Rhône department
 Trèves, former commune of the Maine-et-Loire department, now part of Chênehutte-Trèves-Cunault
 Chênehutte-Trèves-Cunault, in the Maine-et-Loire department
 Saint-Laurent-de-Trèves, in the Lozère department